Timothy (Ted) O'Sullivan (26 July 1899 – 3 March 1971) was an Irish Fianna Fáil politician from County Cork. He was a Teachta Dála (TD) for 27 years, and a Senator for 15 years.

O'Sullivan was elected to Dáil Éireann at his first attempt, as a Fianna Fáil candidate for the Cork West constituency at the 1937 general election. He was re-elected for Cork West at the next five general elections, until he retired from the Dáil at the 1954 general election.

He was then stood in the 1954 election to Seanad Éireann, on the Agricultural Panel, and was elected to the 8th Seanad. He was re-elected by the Agricultural Panel at the next three Seanad elections, before retiring from politics in 1969, after completing his term in the 11th Seanad.

His niece Peggy Farrell was a senator from 1969 to 1973.

See also
Families in the Oireachtas

References

1899 births
1971 deaths
Fianna Fáil TDs
Members of the 9th Dáil
Members of the 10th Dáil
Members of the 11th Dáil
Members of the 12th Dáil
Members of the 13th Dáil
Members of the 14th Dáil
Members of the 8th Seanad
Members of the 9th Seanad
Members of the 10th Seanad
Members of the 11th Seanad
Irish farmers
Politicians from County Cork
Fianna Fáil senators